Lucy is the second studio album by Seattle rock band Candlebox.  Although the album did not fare as well as its 1993 predecessor, the single "Simple Lessons" received considerable airplay, and Lucy eventually achieved gold certification.

Four tracks from Lucy would be included on The Best of Candlebox in 2006.

Background and recording
In an April 1994 interview with Playgirl, an enthusiastic Kevin Martin announced that the band had 36 new songs ready for their second album. Early versions of "Understanding (Racially Motivated)" and "Bothered" were performed live in concert that same year.

Two additional songs were recorded during the Lucy studio sessions: "Featherweight" - a B-side to the "Simple Lessons" single - and "Steel and Glass" - a John Lennon cover song released on the tribute album Working Class Hero: A Tribute to John Lennon.

Touring and promotion
Beginning with a brief European leg, touring for Lucy began in September 1995 and ran through June the following year. Tour mates included Our Lady Peace, Sponge, and Seaweed. On the October 2, 1995 edition of the Late Show with David Letterman, Candlebox performed their lead single, "Simple Lessons."

Music videos were filmed for all three singles. The video for "Understanding," directed by filmmaker Gus Van Sant, memorably features the band underwater, including frontman Kevin Martin singing.

Track listing
All songs written and performed by Candlebox
 "Simple Lessons" — 2:52
 "Drowned" — 4:51
 "Lucy" — 4:45
 "Best Friend" — 3:27
 "Become (To Tell)" — 3:36
 "Understanding" — 4:48
 "Crooked Halo" — 4:02
 "Bothered" — 2:16
 "Butterfly" — 4:54
 "It's Amazing" — 3:59
 "Vulgar Before Me" — 3:37
 "Butterfly (Reprise)" — 6:14

Personnel

Candlebox
Kevin Martin - lead vocals
Peter Klett - guitar
Bardi Martin - bass
Scott Mercado - drums

Additional musicians
Randy Gane - piano

Charts

Certifications

References

1995 albums
Candlebox albums
Maverick Records albums
Albums produced by Kelly Gray